Universal Men is the debut album from Juluka, a South African band led by Johnny Clegg and Sipho Mchunu. It was first released in 1979 and has acquired the status of a classic album in the history of South African music.

The album explores the experiences of a Zulu migrant worker, caught between his traditional rural background and the city where he lives and works.

In addition to Clegg, Mchunu, and other regular Juluka band members, the album features studio musicians including Colin Pratley of the South African progressive rock band Freedom's Children and jazz artists Robbie Jansen, Mervyn Africa and Sipho Gumede of the South African band Spirits Rejoice.

Juluka's early albums did not receive much airplay from the South African Broadcasting Corporation (SABC) at the time because the racially mixed band and fusion of Western and African music were contrary to the country's apartheid policy at the time.

However the album's release coincided with the launch of Capital Radio 604, the station which broke the SABC's monopoly. Juluka's producer took it to the station, and Africa became the first local number one on the Capital Countdown.

Track listing
 "Sky People" – 5:08
 "Universal Men" – 4:46
 "Thula 'Mtanami" – 4:11
 "Deliwe" – 5:21
 "Unkosibomvu" – 5:05
 "Africa" – 3:37
 "Uthando Luphelile" – 5:02
 "Old Eyes" – 3:24
 "Inkunzi Ayihlabi Ngokumisa" – 2:58

Personnel
 Mervyn Africa, keyboards & synthesizer
 Johnny Clegg, lead & backing vocals, guitars, percussion & umhuphe mouth bow
 Sipho Gumede, bass guitar
 Robbie Jansen, flute & saxophone
 Gilbert Mathews, drums
 Sipho Mchunu, lead & backing vocals, guitars & concertina
 Paul Petersen, electric guitars
 Colin Pratley, african drums

Brass – Duke Makasi, George Tyefumani, Thabo Mashishi

Backing Vocals – Anneline Malebo, Bafazane Qoma, Samson Makhunga, Thoko Ndlozi, Umncengeni Ngubane, Umsuthu Nxele, Umvovo Shelembe, Vayisa Mahlaba

References

Juluka albums
1979 debut albums
CBS Records albums